Dee Nunatak is a rock nunatak which appears to be within the flow of Garfield Glacier, in the west part of McDonald Heights, Marie Byrd Land. It was mapped by the United States Geological Survey from surveys and U.S. Navy air photos, 1959–65, and was named by the Advisory Committee on Antarctic Names for Lieutenant Thomas H. Dee, U.S. Navy, Medical Officer at Byrd Station, 1970.

References

Nunataks of Marie Byrd Land